If They Only Knew is an album by saxophonist David Liebman which was recorded in the Netherlands in 1980 and released on the Dutch Timeless label.

Reception

The AllMusic review by Richard S. Ginell stated, "this is a thoughtful, often burning quintet session carooming off the bumpers of post-bop, jazz-rock, and the avant-garde."

Track listing 
All compositions by David Liebman except where noted
 "If They Only Knew" – 8:47  
 "Capistrano" (John Scofield) – 8:28 
 "Moontide" – 5:37
 "Reunion" (Ron McClure) – 7:14  
 "Autumn in New York" (Vernon Duke) – 5:07   
 "Move On Some" – 9:07

Personnel 
David Liebman – tenor saxophone, soprano saxophone
Terumasa Hino – trumpet, flugelhorn
John Scofield – guitar
Ron McClure – double bass
Adam Nussbaum – drums

References 

 

Dave Liebman albums
1981 albums
Timeless Records albums
Impulse! Records albums